"Oh, Lady Be Good!" is a 1924 song by George and Ira Gershwin.  It was introduced by Walter Catlett in the Broadway musical Lady, Be Good! written by Guy Bolton, Fred Thompson, and the Gershwin brothers and starring Fred and Adele Astaire. The song was also performed by the chorus in the film Lady Be Good (1941), although the film is unrelated to the musical.

Recordings in 1925 were by Paul Whiteman, Carl Fenton, and Cliff Edwards. A 1947 recording of the song became a hit for Ella Fitzgerald, notable for her scat solo. For her album Ella Fitzgerald Sings the George and Ira Gershwin Songbook (1959), it was sung as a ballad arranged by Nelson Riddle.

Recorded versions 
 Rob Agerbeek – Three of a Kind (1998)
 Fred Astaire – rec. December 1952 – The Astaire Story
 Count Basie – rec. February 4, 1939 (Decca) 
 Buck and Bubbles – rec. December 26, 1933 (Columbia)
 Kenny Burrell - rec. August 25, 1959 - On View at the Five Spot Cafe (Blue Note)
 Joe Carroll – The Man with the Happy Sound (1962)
 Cliff "Ukulele Ike" Edwards – rec. January 2, 1925
 Carl Fenton and His Orchestra – recorded on December 11, 1924 (Brunswick)
 Ella Fitzgerald – with Bob Haggart (1947)
 Ella Fitzgerald – rec. 1959 – Ella Fitzgerald Sings the George and Ira Gershwin Songbook
 Benny Goodman Trio – rec. April 27, 1936 as the B–side of China Boy (Victor)
 The Gordons with Dizzy Gillespie and Stuff Smith – rec. April 17, 1957
 Jack Hylton and his Orchestra – rec. March 29, 1926
 Buddy Lee with the Gilt–Edged Four – rec. May 17, 1926 (Columbia)
 Charlie Parker and Lester Young for Jazz at the Philharmonic, January 28, 1946
 Dianne Reeves –  We All Love Ella: Celebrating the First Lady of Song (2007)
 Slim & Slam – rec. May 3, 1938 (Vocalion)
 Mel Tormé and Buddy Rich – Together Again: For the First Time (1978)
 Paul Whiteman and His Orchestra – rec. December 29, 1924 (Victor)
 John Wilson Orchestra– Gershwin in Hollywood, live at the Royal Albert Hall (2016)
 Django Reinhardt- Django Reinhardt swing de Paris 4 CD set (2003)

See also 
List of 1920s jazz standards

References

External links 

1924 songs
1925 singles
Songs from Lady, Be Good (musical)
Ella Fitzgerald songs
Pop standards
Songs with music by George Gershwin
Songs with lyrics by Ira Gershwin
1920s jazz standards
Jazz compositions in G major